Solid Bond: The Complete Discography also known as CIV: The Complete Discography is  a compilation album that features all music released by defunct punk rock band CIV, in addition to some never before released tracks. The album was released on May 19, 2009 through Equal Vision Records. This two disc album was the first time CIV has digitally released their music.

Track listing

Personnel
 Anthony Civarelli – Vocals
 Charlie Garriga – Guitar/Backing Vocals
 Arthur Smilios – Bass/Backing Vocals
 Sammy Siegler – Drums

References

CIV (band) albums
2009 compilation albums
Equal Vision Records compilation albums